Humshakal may refer to:
Humshakal (1974 film)
Humshakal (1992 film)
Humshakals, a 2014 Indian romantic comedy film